Yamāntaka or Vajrabhairava (Daewideok-myeongwang;  Daiitoku-myōō;  Erlig-jin Jarghagchi) is the "destroyer of death" deity of Vajrayana Buddhism. Sometimes he is conceptualized as "conqueror of the lord of death". Of the several deities in the Buddhist pantheon named 'Yamāntaka', the most well known, also called as 'Vajrabhairava' belongs to the Anuttarayoga Tantra class of deities popular within the Gelug school of Tibetan Buddhism.

Etymology
Yamāntaka is a Sanskrit name that can be broken down into two primary elements: Yama (यम), –the god of death; and antaka (अन्तक) –destroyer. Thus, Yamāntaka means “Destroyer of Death” or "Conqueror of Death".

While Yamāntaka is therefore Yama's nemesis, his representation mirrors Yama in many ways: he too often rides a buffalo and often depicted with a buffalo's head.

Because of this mirroring of appearance and similarity in name, it is not hard to find texts and books (which would appear to be reliable sources of much material) conflate both Yamāntaka and Yama as being the same deity when they are not. 

Within Buddhism, "terminating death" is a quality of all buddhas as they have stopped the cycle of rebirth, samsara. So Yamāntaka represents the goal of the Mahayana practitioner's journey to enlightenment, or the journey itself: On final awakening, one manifests Yamāntaka – the ending of death.

Outline 
One historic source of name follows Kalantaka, an aspect of the Hindu god Shiva who saves his follower from the clutches of death Yama and is seen as the deity of adherence and origin of the Mahamrityunjaya Mantra of Buddhism and Hinduism.

In Buddhism, Yamāntaka is a wrathful expression of Mañjuśrī, the bodhisattva of wisdom who, in other contexts, also functions as a dharmapala or a Heruka. He adopted this form in order to defeat Yama, the lord of death who was arrogantly interfering with karma by claiming victims before their time was up. Yamantaka submitted Yama by the terrorizing him with his form, one even more frightening than that of Yama himself, which at the same time also acted as mirror of Yama's horrible appearance. Yama then repented his actions and became a guardian of dharma. Through this way, Mañjuśrī also exposed the illusory nature of the fear to death, as well as the unreality of death itself.

Yamāntaka manifests in several different forms, one of which  has six legs, six faces and six arms holding various weapons while sitting or standing on a water buffalo. The topmost face is the wrathful aspect of Mañjuśrī, with a red face below it. The other faces are yellow, dark blue, red, black, white, grey, and brown. Each face has three eyes. Common representations also depict thirty-two hands and sixteen legs.  Also, like Yama, he is represented with an erect penis, symbolizing the alchemy of bodily fluids.

In Chinese Esoteric Buddhism and Shingon Buddhism, Yamāntaka is the wrathful emanation of Amitabha and is pictured with six faces, legs and arms holding various weapons while sitting on a white ox.

Gallery

See also
Kalantaka (Sanskrit: ender of death and time) is an aspect of the Hindu god Shiva as the Conqueror of Time and Death, itself personified by the god Yama.

References

Bibliography
 
 Ra Yeshé Sengé (2015). The All-Pervading Melodious Drumbeat: The Life of Ra Lotsawa. Translated with introduction and notes by Bryan J. Cuevas. Penguin Classics.

External links

Daïitoku
Vajrabhairava (Yamantaka) practice support
Wrathful Guardians of Buddhism - Aesthetics and Mythology
Yamantaka org

Dharmapalas
Horned deities
Wisdom Kings
Death gods
Mañjuśrī
Tibetan Buddhist practices
Herukas
Wrathful deities